Margarete Genske (1918–1992) was a German film actress.

Selected filmography
 The Irresistible Man (1937)
 The Night of Decision (1938)
 We Danced Around the World (1939)
 A Wife for Three Days (1944)
 Four Women (1947)
 A Thief Has Arrived (1950)
 Barrier to the North (1950)
 The Cliff of Sin (1950)
 Plot on the Stage (1953)

References

Bibliography 
 Hans Michael Bock, Wiebke Annkatrin Mosel & Ingrun Spazier. Die Tobis 1928-1945.: Eine kommentierte Filmografie. 2013.

External links 
 

1918 births
1992 deaths
German film actresses
Actresses from Berlin
20th-century German actresses